Chloroclystis breyniae is a moth in the family Geometridae. It was described by Prout in 1958. It is endemic to India.

References

External links

Moths described in 1958
breyniae
Endemic fauna of India
Moths of Asia